Empodisma is a genus of herbaceous rush-like plants in the family Restionaceae first described in 1974. It is native to Australia and New Zealand.

 species
 Empodisma gracillimum (F.Muell.) L.A.S.Johnson & D.F.Cutler - Western Australia
 Empodisma minus (Hook.f.) L.A.S.Johnson & D.F.Cutler - Queensland, New South Wales, Victoria, Tasmania, South Australia, North Island of New Zealand
 Empodisma robustum Wagstaff & B.R.Clarkson - North Island of New Zealand

References

Restionaceae
Poales genera